Javier Castro Gonzalez (born August 15, 1991) is a Mexican professional footballer currently with Moreno Valley FC in the United Premier Soccer League.

Early life and education 
Castro was born August 15, 1991, in Guadalajara, Mexico.  He played youth soccer in Southern California and attended International Polytechnic High School.  He was a finalist for Sueño MLS in 2010.

Castro attended Mt. San Antonio College and played college soccer from 2010 to 2011.  He scored 23 goals and assisted on 21 others over his two seasons with the team.

He transferred to the University of California, Santa Barbara and played with the UC Santa Barbara Gauchos men's soccer team in 2012, appearing in 16 games and scoring 3 goals with 1 assist.

Playing career 
While attending college, Castro appeared for USL Premier Development League club OC Blues Strikers FC in 2013.  He appeared in 6 games for the club, scoring 4 goals.

Castro skipped his senior year at UC Santa Barbara and would appear in 2013 and 2014 for the U-23 side of Chivas USA.  Later in 2014, he spent time with Los Angeles Misioneros and appeared in 7 games, scoring 7 goals with 3 assists.

Castro signed professional terms with USL Pro club Oklahoma City Energy FC in July 2014.  He was not retained by the club and joined Ventura County Fusion in 2015.  He appeared in 8 games for the Fusion, scoring one goal.

Castro went on trial with Segunda División de México side Real Cuautitlán in 2016, but it was ultimately unsuccessful.  He would later trial with Kitsap Pumas successfully and was announced as a signing by the club in April 2016.

References

External links 
 Kitsap Pumas player profile
 PDL player profile
 UC Santa Barbara player profile

1991 births
Living people
Footballers from Guadalajara, Jalisco
Association football forwards
Mexican footballers
UC Santa Barbara Gauchos men's soccer players
OC Pateadores Blues players
LA Laguna FC players
OKC Energy FC players
Ventura County Fusion players
Kitsap Pumas players
USL League Two players
United Premier Soccer League players
Mexican expatriate footballers
Expatriate soccer players in the United States
Mexican expatriate sportspeople in the United States